Arshin may refer to:

 Arşın, a Turkish unit of length corresponding to a yard
 Arshin Astrakhan Oblast, a rural locality in Russia
 Arshin, an obsolete Russian unit of length corresponding to a forearm or cubit